Dieter Walter Ehrlich (born 20 September 1941) is a German former field hockey player who competed at the 1964 Summer Olympics and the 1968 Summer Olympics. He was born in Dohna, Saxony, Germany.

Olympic events 
1964 Summer Olympics in Tokyo, competing for the United Team of Germany:
 Men's field hockey – 5th place

1968 Summer Olympics in Mexico City, competing for East Germany:
 Men's field hockey – 11th place

References

External links
 

1941 births
Living people
People from Dohna
German male field hockey players
Sportspeople from Saxony
Olympic field hockey players of the United Team of Germany
Olympic field hockey players of East Germany
Field hockey players at the 1964 Summer Olympics
Field hockey players at the 1968 Summer Olympics